Sagarmatha Friendship 2017 was the first joint army drill between armies of Nepal and China. It was hosted in Nepal by Nepali Army in 2017 at Kathmandu based Maharajgunj Training School.  The joint drill was focused in counter insurgency and counter terrorism. The drill lasted for 10 days from 16–25 April 2017. The drill was inaugurated  by Major General Binod Kumar Shrestha from Nepali army and Colonel Yang Shumeng  from people liberation army of China. A 22-member delegation from the Chinese special force led by Colonel Yang Shumeng had come to join the training. The initial planned size was a battalion-scale military exercises, however, due to opposition from India, the drill was scaled down.

Nepal had proposed joint military exercises during Chinese Defence Minister General Chang Wanquan’s official visit to Nepal on March 24, 2017.

The drill was concluded by Lieutenant General Baldev Raj Mahat and Major General Zhang Jiangang.

References

Non-combat military operations involving Nepal
China–Nepal relations
2017 in Nepal
Military exercises and wargames
Military exercises involving China